Pucacuro National Reserve is a protected area in Peru, located in the region of Loreto.

Geography 
The reserve comprises the Pucacuro River basin, a forested area with hills, river terraces, seasonally flooded terrain, swamps, meandering rivers and ca. 40 oxbow lakes. Besides the Pucacuro River (a tributary of the Tigre River), other important rivers in the reserve are the Aleman and Baratillo rivers.

Ecology 
The reserve is located in the Napo moist forests ecoregion.

Flora 
Plant species present in the reserve include: Mauritia flexuosa, Oenocarpus bataua, Astrocaryum chambira, Iriartea deltoidea, Euterpe precatoria, Couma macrocarpa, Parahancornia peruviana, Ceiba pentandra, Socratea exorrhiza, Cedrela odorata, Vochysia lomatophylla, Simarouba amara, Calophyllum brasiliense, Cedrelinga cateniformis, Iryanthera macrophylla, Osteophloeum platyspermum, Ocotea aciphylla, etc.

References

External links 

 Pucacuro National Reserve. Profile at Protectedplanet.net

Reserved zones of Peru
Geography of Loreto Region